Psalm 50, a Psalm of Asaph, is the 50th psalm from the Book of Psalms in the Bible, beginning in English in the King James Version: "The mighty God, even the LORD, hath spoken, and called the earth from the rising of the sun unto the going down thereof." In the slightly different numbering system used in the Greek Septuagint and Latin Vulgate translations of the Bible, this psalm is Psalm 49. The opening words in Latin are Deus deorum, Dominus, locutus est / et vocavit terram a solis ortu usque ad occasum. The psalm is a prophetic imagining of God's judgment on the Israelites.

The psalm forms a regular part of Jewish, Catholic, Lutheran, Anglican and other Protestant liturgies. It has been set to music completely and in single verses. The phrase A solis ortu usque ad occasum, taken from verse 1, is part of a Spanish coat of arms.

Composition
The psalm has been variously dated to either the 8th century BC, the time of the prophets Hosea and Micah, or to a time after the Babylonian captivity. The latter date is supported by the reference to "gathering" in verse 5, but is problematic because verse 2 describes Zion (another name for Jerusalem) as "the perfection of beauty", even though Jerusalem was destroyed in 587 BC.

Text
The psalm can be divided into an introduction (verses 1-6), two separate orations in which God testifies against the Jews (verses 7-15 and 16-21), and a conclusion (verses 22-23). The imagery of the introduction evokes the revelation of the Ten Commandments at Mount Sinai, where God's appearance was accompanied by thunder and lightning. God summons the heavens and the earth to act as witnesses, and the rest of the psalm takes the form of a legal proceeding, with God acting as both plaintiff and judge. The same metaphor of a divine tribunal occurs in chapter 1 of the Book of Isaiah and chapter 6 of the Book of Micah.

In God's first oration, he tells the people that he is not satisfied with material sacrifices alone, since he does not require food or drink. Rather, he desires his people to worship him with thanksgiving and sincere prayer. Verse 13, "Do I eat the flesh of bulls, or drink the blood of goats?" may be an allusion to the goddess Anat, since in one fragmentary text Anat eats the flesh and drinks the blood of her brother Baal, who sometimes appears as a bull.

God's second oration is warning against hypocrisy. Though the hypocrites often recite God's commandments, they inwardly hate them and make no effort to live by them, and God will surely bring them to judgment.

The psalm closes with a final warning against iniquity and a promise that God will bless the righteous and make them "drink deeply of the salvation of God". This last is an appearance of the common biblical theme of the "Messianic banquet," which also occurs in Psalm 23, Psalm 16, and Luke 14, among other places.

Uses

Judaism
Psalm 50 is recited on the fourth day of Sukkot.

Book of Common Prayer
In the Church of England's Book of Common Prayer, this psalm is appointed to be read on the morning of the tenth day of the month.

Musical settings 
In a Scottish Psalter of 1650, Psalm 50 was paraphrased rhymed in English as "The mighty God, the Lord, Hath spoken unto all". The 1863 hymn "For the Beauty of the Earth" by Folliott Sandford Pierpoint issues verse 14.

Heinrich Schütz set Psalm 50 in a rhymed version in the Becker Psalter, as "Gott unser Herr, mächtig durchs Wort", SWV 147. The last verse is used in German in the opening chorus of Bach's cantata Wer Dank opfert, der preiset mich, BWV 17, composed in 1726.

F. Melius Christiansen created a famous choral arrangement of Psalm 50 in 1922. This setting was dedicated to the St. Olaf Choir for the 10th anniversary of the choir's formation.

Notes

Bibliography

External links 

 
 
 Text of Psalm 50 according to the 1928 Psalter
 Psalms Chapter 50 text in Hebrew and English, mechon-mamre.org
 A psalm of Asaph. / The God of gods, the LORD, has spoken and summoned the earth from the rising of the sun to its setting text and footnotes, usccb.org United States Conference of Catholic Bishops
 Psalm 50:1 introduction and text, biblestudytools.com
 Psalm 50 – Judgment Begins Among the People of God enduringword.com
 Psalm 50 / Refrain: Offer to God a sacrifice of thanksgiving. Church of England
 Psalm 50 at biblegateway.com
 Hymns for Psalm 50 hymnary.org
 Nova Vulgata version of Psalm 50(49)

050
Anat